Navsari railway station  is a railway station serving Navsari city, in Navsari district of Gujarat State of India. It is "A" category railway station of Mumbai WR railway division of Western Railway zone. It is under Mumbai WR railway division of Western Railway zone of Indian Railways. It is located on New Delhi–Mumbai main line of the Indian Railways.

It is located at 14 m above sea level and has three platforms. As of 2016, the railway line is electrified double broad-gauge railway line. At this station, 90 Passenger, MEMU, Express, and Superfast trains halt here each day. Surat Airport, is at distance of 28 kilometers.

References

Railway stations in Navsari district
Mumbai WR railway division